The 2022 Traralgon International was a professional tennis tournament played on outdoor hard courts. It was the seventh (women) and ninth (men) editions of the tournament which was part of the 2022 ATP Challenger Tour and the 2022 ITF Women's World Tennis Tour. It took place in Traralgon, Australia between 3 and 9 January 2022.

Men's singles main-draw entrants

Seeds

 1 Rankings are as of 27 December 2021.

Other entrants
The following players received wildcards into the singles main draw:
  Joshua Charlton
  Blake Ellis
  Jeremy Jin
  Philip Sekulic
  Gilles Simon

The following player received entry as an alternate into the singles main draw:
  Brandon Walkin

The following players received entry from the qualifying draw:
  Ernests Gulbis
  Calum Puttergill
  Divij Sharan
  Rubin Statham

The following players received entry as lucky losers:
  Patrick Fitzgerald
  David Hough

Women's singles main-draw entrants

Seeds

 1 Rankings are as of 27 December 2021.

Other entrants
The following players received wildcards into the singles main draw:
  Isabella Bozicevic
  Roisin Gilheany
  Lisa Mays
  Annerly Poulos

The following player received entry using a protected ranking:
  Samantha Murray Sharan

The following players received entry from the qualifying draw:
  Emina Bektas
  Catherine Harrison
  Richèl Hogenkamp
  Jesika Malečková
  Marina Melnikova
  Tara Moore
  Tereza Mrdeža
  Anastasia Zakharova

The following players received entry as lucky losers:
  Marie Benoît
  Miriam Kolodziejová
  Andrea Lázaro García

Champions

Men's singles

  Tomáš Macháč def.  Bjorn Fratangelo 7–6(7–2), 6–3.

Women's singles

  Yuan Yue def.  Paula Ormaechea, 6–3, 6–2

Men's doubles

  Manuel Guinard /  Zdeněk Kolář def.  Marc-Andrea Hüsler /  Dominic Stricker 6–3, 6–4.

Women's doubles

  Emina Bektas /  Tara Moore def.  Catherine Harrison /  Aldila Sutjiadi, 0–6, 7–6(7–1), [10–8]

References

External links
 2022 Traralgon International at ITFtennis.com
 2022 Traralgon International at ATPtour.com

2022 ATP Challenger Tour
2022 ITF Women's World Tennis Tour
2022 in Australian tennis
January 2022 sports events in Australia